Pheloticus is a genus of leaf beetles in the subfamily Eumolpinae. It is found in Madagascar.

Species
 Pheloticus achardi (Bechyné, 1947)
 Pheloticus achardi achardi (Bechyné, 1947)
 Pheloticus achardi boreella (Bechyné, 1951)
 Pheloticus achardi sequens (Bechyné, 1951)
 Pheloticus achardi tabens (Bechyné, 1947)
 Pheloticus affinis Brancsik, 1893
 Pheloticus allotrophicus (Bechyné, 1950)
 Pheloticus argopoides (Fairmaire, 1869)
 Pheloticus bipartitus (Fairmaire, 1886)
 Pheloticus costatipennis (Jacoby, 1877)
 Pheloticus dilutus (Lefèvre, 1877) – also known from Réunion
 Pheloticus distentus (Bechyné, 1946)
 Pheloticus diversicornis (Bechyné, 1947)
 Pheloticus lefevrei (Jacoby, 1901)
 Pheloticus madagascariensis (Jacoby, 1877)
 Pheloticus nigricollis (Jacoby, 1877)
 Pheloticus pallidipennis Jacoby, 1895
 Pheloticus perroti (Jacoby, 1895)
 Pheloticus rogezianus (Bechyné, 1949)
 Pheloticus rogezianus rogezianus (Bechyné, 1949)
 Pheloticus rogezianus sambiranensis (Bechyné, 1949)
 Pheloticus rugicollis (Jacoby, 1897)
 Pheloticus strigicollis (Fairmaire, 1886)

References

Eumolpinae
Chrysomelidae genera
Beetles of Africa
Insects of Madagascar
Endemic fauna of Madagascar